The Sierra Leone Girl Guides Association is the national Guiding organization of Sierra Leone. It serves 2,600 members (as of 2018). Founded in 1924, the girls-only organization became a full member of the World Association of Girl Guides and Girl Scouts in 1963. The current headquarters of the organization is at Tower Hill, Freetown, Western Area.

The membership badge of the Sierra Leone Girl Guides Association incorporates a lion and a palm tree in front of mountains, suggesting Lion Mountain, the translation of the country's name.

Publications 
 The Sierra Leone Girl Guides Association (ed.): 60 years of guiding: Girl Guides, 1924-1984. "Service through guiding". Sierra Leone, 1984

See also 
Sierra Leone Scouts Association

References

World Association of Girl Guides and Girl Scouts member organizations
Scouting and Guiding in Sierra Leone

Youth organizations established in 1924
1924 establishments in Sierra Leone